David Liam Lloyd (born 15 June 1992) is a Welsh cricketer who plays for Glamorgan County Cricket Club. He is a right-handed batsman and right-arm medium-pace bowler.

Born in St Asaph, Denbighshire, and educated at Darland High School and Shrewsbury School, Lloyd made his debut in county cricket for Wales Minor Counties against Herefordshire in the 2010 Minor Counties Championship, making two further appearances in that season against Wiltshire and Dorset. The following season he made four appearances in the Minor Counties Championship, as well as making his debut in the MCCA Knockout Trophy against Cornwall, playing twice more in that competition against Wiltshire and Berkshire. He also made three appearances in the 2012 MCCA Knockout Trophy.

Having played for the Glamorgan Second XI since 2008, he joined their playing staff in 2012, and made his first-class debut for the county against Yorkshire in the 2012 County Championship, followed by a second first-class appearance against Kent in the same season.

In September 2022, Lloyd hit a career-best 313 not out in the first innings of a County Championship match against Derbyshire; it was the second highest score of all time by a Glamorgan batsman, the highest in a Glamorgan home match and the highest by a Glamorgan captain.

References

External links

1992 births
Living people
Sportspeople from St Asaph
People educated at Shrewsbury School
Welsh cricketers
Wales National County cricketers
Glamorgan cricketers
Welsh Fire cricketers